Scappoose  is a city in Columbia County, Oregon,  United States. It was named for a nearby stream, which drains the southern part of the county. The name "Scappoose" is of Native American origin, and is said to mean "gravelly plain."  The population was 6,592 at the 2010 census.

Government 

The Mayor is elected for a two-year term and is chair of the City Council.

The City Manager supervisions and general management of all City operations and ensures that Council policy is carried out and that laws and municipal code are in compliance.

The City Council consists of a mayor and six councilors elected from the City at large who are residents of the City. Three Councilors each are elected for four year terms every two years. The Council sets policy and retains legislative authority. Meetings are usually held on the first and third Monday of every month.

Geography

Climate
This region experiences warm (but not hot) and dry summers, with no average monthly temperatures above .  According to the Köppen Climate Classification system, Scappoose has a warm-summer Mediterranean climate, abbreviated "Csb" on climate maps.

Demographics

2010 census
As of the census of 2010, there were 6,592 people, 2,536 households, and 1,791 families residing in the city. The racial makeup of the city was 91.2% White, 0.4% African American, 1.2% Native American, 1.3% Asian, 0.2% Pacific Islander, 2.2% from other races, and 3.5% from two or more races. Hispanic or Latino of any race were 5.1% of the population.

There were 2,536 households, of which 37.3% had children under the age of 18 living with them, 53.0% were married couples living together, 12.2% had a female householder with no husband present, 5.4% had a male householder with no wife present, and 29.4% were non-families. 23.5% of all households were made up of individuals, and 9.8% had someone living alone who was 65 years of age or older. The average household size was 2.56 and the average family size was 3.01.

The median age in the city was 37.8 years. 26% of residents were under the age of 18; 6.9% were between the ages of 18 and 24; 27.7% were from 25 to 44; 26.2% were from 45 to 64; and 13.3% were 65 years of age or older. The gender makeup of the city was 48.1% male and 51.9% female. The median income for a household in the city was $47,796, and the median income for a family was $55,616. Males had a median income of $43,625 versus $27,346 for females. The per capita income for the city was $20,837. About 4.5% of families and 6.1% of the population were below the poverty line, including 7.7% of those under age 18 and 7.2% of those age 65 or over.

Economy

In recent years, Scappoose has increasingly become a "bedroom" community of Portland, Oregon, with many commuting to jobs in the city.  Dairies, farming, and logging played an important role in the early years of Scappoose's history. In the more recent past, several factories existed in the community and provided jobs.  The town was home to a shoe factory, two candle factories, and a Steinfeld's Sauerkraut factory.  The area still has gravel mines and the West Coast Shoe factory.  Scappoose is also the home of Oregon Aero, Inc., a supplier of aeronautic seats and helmets.

On April 6, 2009, the Scappoose City Council voted to significantly reduce development fees in an effort in encourage new industrial and commercial development. Also, the council waived business license fees for Scappoose-based businesses in 2010.

Education
Grant Watts Elementary, Petersen Elementary, Scappoose Middle School and Scappoose High School are part of the Scappoose School District, which also has one school in Portland on Sauvie Island, and two schools in Warren, including Warren Elementary and the South Columbia Family School.

Transportation

Airports

Rail lines
 Northern Pacific Railway

Highways
 U.S. Route 30 in Oregon

Public transit
 The county-operated Columbia County Rider bus service connects Scappoose with downtown Portland.

Notable people

 Derek Anderson - former NFL quarterback for the Buffalo Bills, former OSU quarterback. Participant in Super Bowl 50.
 CC Barber - Miss Oregon beauty pageant titleholder
 Roy Hennessey - nurseryman
 Bruce Hugo - politician
 Betsy Johnson - politician
 Judith Pella - writer
 Greg Strobel - college wrestling coach, two-time NCAA champion for OSU.
 Sara Jean Underwood - Playboy Playmate, July 2006; 2007 Playmate of the Year
 Willy Vlautin - author, singer, songwriter
 David Mayo (American football) - NFL linebacker for the Washington Football Team, former linebacker for Texas State University, and participant in Super Bowl 50 in the 2015 NFL season.

References

External links

 
 Entry for Scappoose in the Oregon Blue Book
City charter

 
Cities in Oregon
Cities in Columbia County, Oregon
1921 establishments in Oregon
Oregon placenames of Native American origin